Daryl Hobbs (born May 23, 1968 in Victoria, Texas) is a former professional American football player who played wide receiver for five seasons for the Los Angeles/Oakland Raiders, New Orleans Saints, and Seattle Seahawks. He played in the Canadian Football League from 1999 to 2000 with the Montreal Alouettes and Saskatchewan Roughriders. Hobbs also played in the XFL for the Memphis Maniax. He was also a member of the Kansas City Chiefs.

In 2012, Daryl Hobbs took over the head coach position with Robert E. Lee High School in Houston, Texas.  Previous to that assignment, Hobbs served as the head coach at Legacy Christian High School for two years in Beaumont, Texas.  At Legacy Christian, he turned a winless team to have a 13-8 record and in 2011, his best season, Legacy Christian was within in one game of going to playoffs.

See also
 List of NCAA major college football yearly receiving leaders

References

External links
Just Sports Stats
Pro-Football-Reference
Memphis Maniax profile
Fanbase playing career
Sports Illustrated profile

1968 births
American football wide receivers
Santa Monica Corsairs football players
Pacific Tigers football players
Los Angeles Raiders players
Oakland Raiders players
New Orleans Saints players
Seattle Seahawks players
Living people
Players of American football from Texas
Memphis Maniax players
People from Victoria, Texas
Montreal Alouettes players
Saskatchewan Roughriders players
Kansas City Chiefs players